M Kamalathal, affectionately known as the Idli Amma (mother) and Paatima (grandmother), is an Indian social worker known particularly for her work in making & selling Idlis to migrant workers and needy for INR 1.

Social works
Kamalathal, an octogenarian and a resident of Vadivelampalayam on the Coimbatore city outskirts, is known for her selfless service-cum-low margin business model. She sells around 600 Idlis  every day for INR 1 a piece with sambar and chutney side dishes, all of which she prepares alone.

References

Social workers
Living people
People from Coimbatore district
Year of birth missing (living people)